Ambreen Arshad (born 22 April 1992, Bahawalpur) is a field hockey player from Pakistan. She is the current vice-captain of the national team (as of 20 November 2020). As of January 2018, she has scored 7 goals and earned 28 international caps. Her playing position is left in.

Career

National 
At the national level, Arshad plays for WAPDA.

International 
Arshad was a member of the team which placed 8th at the Junior Asia Cup held in Bangkok, Thailand in 2012. The team was placed in Pool B with Korea, Japan, Thailand and Kazakhstan.  She was part of the which came sixth at the 3rd Women's AHF Cup held in Singapore in 2012. She participated in the 2nd Asian Hockey Challenge held in Bangkok, Thailand in September 2013 during which she scored 2 goals and played in all 6 matches including the 3/4 playoff. Coming on in the 13th minute, she score twice (field goals) in the 4–0 win over Myanmar. Arshad participated in the 31st Surjit Singh Hockey Tournament held in Jalandhar, India in 2014.

At 4th Women's AHF Cup held in Bangkok, Thailand in 2016, she was part of the team which qualified for the semi-finals, and eventually placed 4th. She played in five matches including the semi-finals and the 3/4 playoff. In the bronze medal match, she scored the only goal against Chinese Taipei in a 4–1 loss.

She was the vice-captain of the team which participated in the Women's Asia Challenge 2017, held in Bandar Seri Begawan, Brunei, starting in all six matches including the final. She was the joint top scorer for her team with 3 goals (2 field goals and 1 penalty stroke) all scored against Brunei. At the 2018 Asian Games qualifiers held in Bangkok, Thailand, Arshad was again the vice-captain and started all six games, scoring a solitary goal through a penalty corner against Indonesia. She also earned a yellow card in the 7 nil loss to Thailand.

References 

Living people
Pakistani women field hockey players
1992 births